Anti-tank trenches, also called anti-tank ditches, are ditches dug into and around fortified positions to hold up the advance of enemy tanks. Anti-tank ditches were first used in World War I by Germany in an effort to protect their trenches against the newly developed British and French tanks. An anti-tank ditch has to be wide enough and deep enough to prevent a tank from crossing. Armies have been known to disguise anti-tank ditches to enable the ditch to disable an enemy tank. Anti-tank trenches can be defeated by use of a fascine. Anti-tank ditches can also be crossed by use of bridges either laid by armoured vehicles or built over them, they can also be defeated by demolition of each side, using explosives, to make inclines that can be cossed or can be filled in by earth moving equipment.

According to the United States Army, there are several methods by which combat engineers can dig an anti-tank ditch on the battlefield.  Using only hand tools, a platoon of soldiers can dig a triangular-shaped ditch 100 feet long, 12 feet wide and 6 feet deep in seven and a half hours; a trapezoidal-shaped ditch of similar dimensions would take fourteen hours.  Equipping the platoon with a 3/4 cubic yard power shovel cuts these digging times to four and a half hours and nine hours respectively.  Alternatively, a squad of soldiers with a power auger and sufficient demolition charges can blast a ditch 100 yards long, 30 feet wide and 12 feet deep in twelve hours.

See also 

 Anti-tank warfare

References 

Anti-tank obstacles